Soldiers of Misfortune may refer to:

Soldiers of Misfortune (album), 1991 album by Sacrifice
Soldiers of Misfortune (song), 2008 song by Filter
Army Men: Soldiers of Misfortune, a 2008 video game and the last home console title in the Army Men video game series